Andrzej Bartkowiak, A.S.C. (born 6 March 1950) is a Polish cinematographer and film director.

Career 
In the early 1980s, Bartkowiak was cinematographer on three films that received Academy Award nominations for Best Picture: The Verdict, Terms of Endearment, and Prizzi's Honor.  During that decade, Bartkowiak  also developed a close working relationship with director Sidney Lumet, acting as director of photography on almost all of Lumet's movies between 1981 (Prince of the City) and 1993 (Guilty as Sin).

Bartkowiak made his directorial debut with Romeo Must Die, a martial arts action film starring Jet Li and Aaliyah, which grossed $91 million at the box office.  A year later he made the action thriller film Exit Wounds starring Steven Seagal, the film was a hit in theaters. Cradle 2 the Grave was a moderate success at the box-office.
 
Later he teamed up with Ashok Amritraj's Hyde Park Entertainment and Capcom to direct Street Fighter: The Legend of Chun-Li. 

In 2010, he worked as cinematographer in the thriller Trespass, directed by Joel Schumacher, both had collaborated before on Falling Down.

Filmography 
As cinematographer

As director
 Romeo Must Die (2000)
 Exit Wounds (2001)
 Cradle 2 the Grave (2003)
 Doom (2005)
 Street Fighter: The Legend of Chun-Li (2009)
 Maximum Impact (2017)
 Dead Reckoning (2020)

References

External links 
 

1950 births
Living people
Polish cinematographers
Polish film directors
Polish television directors
Action film directors
Polish emigrants to the United States
Film people from Łódź